Dismorphia zaela, the zaela mimic white, is a butterfly in the family Pieridae. It is found from Costa Rica to Ecuador.

The larvae feed on Inga species, including Inga pittieri.

Subspecies
The following subspecies are recognised:
Dismorphia zaela zaela (Ecuador)
Dismorphia zaela abilene (Hewitson, [1872]) (Ecuador)
Dismorphia zaela oreas (Salvin, 1871) (Costa Rica, Panama)

References

Dismorphiinae
Butterflies of Central America
Pieridae of South America
Lepidoptera of Brazil
Lepidoptera of Colombia
Lepidoptera of Ecuador
Fauna of the Amazon
Butterflies described in 1858